Kobi Wolf is an Israeli photographer, specializing in photojournalism.

Biography 
Kobi Wolf graduated from the Geographical Photography Academy in Tel Aviv. He traveled extensively to Asia and Africa for eight years after graduation, documenting local life. After returning to Israel, Wolf mostly working in the area of Israeli–Palestinian conflict and social protest. He also documents the refugees from Africa. He works as a freelance news photojournalist for local and international news agencies, including Times of Israel, Haaretz, Al Jazeera, The Eye of Photography, Time.

Exhibitions 
Kobi Wolf exhibits mostly in Israel. He is a regular participant of the Local Testimony exhibition in Eretz Israel Museum, where he exhibited every year from 2011. He held a solo exhibition "Pictures from Abarbanel" in gallery of Masa Acher School of Photography in Tel Aviv, curated by Miki Kratsman. He participated in Israel's International Photography Festival in 2012.

Awards
Kobi Wolf won numerous awards at Local Testimony, including first prize for best series in 2015.

See also
Visual arts in Israel
Journalism in Israel

References 

Israeli photojournalists
1975 births
Living people